Stegodon aurorae, also  known as the , is a species of fossil elephantoid known from Early Pleistocene (2.0 Ma – 1.0 Ma) Japan and Taiwan.

Description
It is relatively short-legged, the ratio between vertebral column length and shoulder height being 0.88.

Distribution
Remains of Stegodon aurorae have been found in over forty-five localities in the Japanese archipelago, mainly in central Honshū. The type specimen was from Ishikawa Prefecture, while among the eight skeletons, one was found in Saitama Prefecture, two in Nagano Prefecture, one in Shiga Prefecture, one in Mie Prefecture, and three in Hyōgo Prefecture. A fragmentary lower jaw with part of a third molar has also been recovered from "Cho-chen", Taiwan.

Biozone
The species lends its name to the biostratigraphic assemblage zone referred to as the "S. aurorae Zone". This biozone, from two to one million years ago, includes deer (Elaphurus spp., Cervus sp.) and rhino (Rhinoceros sp.) as species that competed for resources, as well as the predator Falconer's wolf (Canis falconeri).

Faunal succession
Proboscidean fossils have been recovered from over three hundred and fifty sites in Japan. In accordance with the principle of faunal succession, the following sequence has been established: Gomphotherium annectens, Stegolophodon pseudolatidens, Sinomastodon sendaicus, Stegodon miensis, S. protoaurorae, S. aurorae, Mammuthus trogontherii, S. orientalis, Palaeoloxodon naumanni, and M. primigenius.

Speciation
Cladistic analysis of cranial characters suggests a close relationship between Stegodon aurorae and Stegodon zdanskyi from northern China. S. zdanskyi are thought to have reached Japan over a land bridge in the Early Pliocene, giving rise there to the smaller S. miensis, the earliest of the four stegodontids found in the Japanese archipelago, after isolation from the mainland due to the receding ice. The "biostratigraphical gap" between S. miensis (c. 4–2.9 Ma) and S. aurorae (c. 2–1 Ma) is filled by S. protoaurorae (c. 2.9–2 Ma), its speciation perhaps "triggered" by marine transgression, with successive decreases in size an "evolutionary trend". The absence of S. aurorae from the fossil record of China and the Korean Peninsula supports the theory of the species arising within the archipelago.

Taxonomy
Elephas aurorae was described by Matsumoto Hikoshichirō in 1918, based on an upper molar from Mount Tomuro in the old Province of Kaga (present-day Ishikawa Prefecture). In 1924, Matsumoto erected the genus Parastegodon and transferred to it the Akebono elephant, the new combination being Parastegodon aurorae. In 1938, Makiyama Jirō synonymized Parastegodon with Stegodon. In a 1991 review of the former genus Parastegodon, Taruno Hiroyuki confirmed the synonymization of Stegodon kwantoensis (Tokunaga, 1934), Stegodon sugiyamai (Tokunaga, 1935), Stegodon akashiensis (Takai, 1936), and Stegodon infrequens (Shikama, 1937), as well as some of the material referred to Stegodon shodoensis Matsumoto, 1924, with Stegodon aurorae.

Stegodon orientalis shodoensis was described by Matsumoto in 1924, from material from the village of Yoshima [ja] (now Sakaide), Kagawa Prefecture. The subspecies was elevated to species rank by Makiyama in 1938. Some of the material referred to  belongs to S. aurorae. Additional material from the coast of and sea bed off Akashi, including two skulls and a lower jaw, was published at the same time and referred to P. akashiensis by Shikama Tokio. P. kwantoensis, P. sugiyamai, and some of the material referred to P. akashiensis were synonymized with P. aurorae, and P. infrequens with P. akashiensis, by Takai in 1938. Taruno synonymized P. akashiensis with S. aurorae in 1991.

See also
 List of prehistoric mammals of Japan
 National Museum of Nature and Science

References

Stegodontidae
Pleistocene proboscideans
Pleistocene mammals of Asia
Fossils of Japan
Fossil taxa described in 1918